N. D. Ananda Rao Samuel (1928–1999) was Bishop of Krishna Godavari of the Church of South India.

Early years
Ananda Rao Samuel was born on 29 December 1928 in the port town of Machilipatnam, Andhra Pradesh into a Dalit Anglican family and studied at the local Noble College during 1944 to 1949 earning the degrees of BA and MA. His parents were Namala Jemima and Namala Thomas Gnanaprakasam.

Theological life
The Church Missionary Society (CMS) brought about the Gospel in Machilipatnam.  With the formation of the Church of South India (CSI) in 1947, the CMS got merged into the CSI.  From 1950, Ananda Rao pursued a graduate degree in divinity (BD) at the United Theological College, Bengaluru as a candidate of the Church of South India, Diocese of Krishna-Godavari.

Soon after returning from Bengaluru in 1953, he was ordained on 14 June 1953 and made a Presbyter in Machilipatnam during the Bishopric of Yeddy Muthyalu.

Later in 1959 he was made Presbyter in Vijayawada during the Bishopric of A. B. Elliott.

In 1955, he was sent to the Union Theological Seminary in the city of New York where he earned an S.T.M. in Pastoral Counselling.

Professorship
During the academic years 1949–1950 and 1954–1955, Ananda Rao lectured English Literature at the Andhra-Christian College, Guntur.

After Ananda Rao returned from the Union Theological Seminary in the city of New York in 1956, he began tutoring at the Andhra Union Theological Seminary, Dornakal.

After his chaplaincy stint at Vellore, Ananda Rao taught Pastoral Counselling at his alma mater, the United Theological College, Bengaluru.

Contribution
Ananda Rao played a key role in priesthood for women. As Bishop and Moderator of the Church of South India, he brought about the topic for discussion and debate at synodical platforms.  In 1980, the CSI passed a resolution granting ordination for theologically-trained women.

The formation of the Joint Council of the Church of South India, Church of North India and the Mar Thoma is attributed to Ananda Rao.  In Andhra Pradesh, Lutherans and Baptists could not join the Church of South India due to Lay leadership.  However, Ananda Rao had been instrumental in trying to negotiate for their inclusion.

Ananda Rao participated in the Fifth Assembly of the World Council of Churches held from 23 November – 10 December 1975 in Nairobi

In 1993, he founded Pravaham in Vellore District.

Subsequent to his laying down the office of bishop, Ananda Rao was made Senior Chaplain at the Christian Medical College & Hospital, Vellore.  Later after his death in 1999, Sundar Clarke released a book on his writings on 18 January 2001 in Vellore District.

Bishopric
After the retirement of A. B. Elliott as bishop in Krishna-Godavari, N. D. Ananda Rao Samuel was elected unanimously as his successor in 1961 and consecrated in the Cathedral in Eluru on 12 December 1961.

He was also elected as the Moderator of the Church of South India at a later stage, succeeding Isaac Richard Harrison Gnanadasan.

Honours
India's first University, the Senate of Serampore College (University) in West Bengal conferred upon Ananda Rao Samuel an honorary doctorate in 1989.

Death
After teaching Christian Ministry at the United Theological College, Bengaluru, Ananda Rao began living in Chennai and died on 30 May 1999 in KGF.

See also

 B. V. Subbamma
 Emani Sambayya
 Victor Premasagar
 G. Dyvasirvadam

References

Further reading
 

Indian Christian theologians
Telugu people
20th-century Anglican bishops in India
Anglican bishops of Krishna-Godavari
1928 births
1999 deaths
Senate of Serampore College (University) alumni
People from Krishna district
Union Theological Seminary (New York City) alumni
Academic staff of the Senate of Serampore College (University)
Moderators of the Church of South India